Saturday Evening Puss is a 1950 one-reel animated cartoon and is the 48th Tom and Jerry short directed by William Hanna and Joseph Barbera. The cartoon was released on January 14, 1950, produced by Fred Quimby, scored by Scott Bradley and animated by Ed Barge, Kenneth Muse, Irven Spence and Ray Patterson. It is the only Tom and Jerry cartoon to feature Mammy's face on-screen, though only briefly. A re-edited version was produced in the 1960s replacing Mammy with a white teenage girl.

Plot 
Mammy leaves for her Saturday night bridge club. Tom then rushes to the window and signals to his three alley cat friends, Butch, Topsy, and Lightning that it is "ok for the party". They arrive for a loud session of jazz music; however, the noise disturbs Jerry, who is trying to sleep. He complains to Tom, who ignores him. Jerry tries to disrupt the party by tearing the tonearm off the phonograph, shutting Topsy in a drawer and slamming the piano lid shut on Butch's hands. The cats chase Jerry back into his mouse hole but, deciding that they will not be able to party as long as Jerry is around, turn their music back on to lure him out again.

An angry Jerry takes the bait, and the cats chase him. Tom eventually catches him and ties him up with windowsill string. Nevertheless, Jerry loses his temper and reaches the telephone and calls Mammy, telling her about the party. Mammy races back home (during which scene her face is briefly shown for the only time) and confronts the cats. The cats try to run but Mammy grabs Tom by the tail and unleashes her fury, throwing all four cats out the front door. At home, Mammy badmouths the cats for ruining her entire evening. She then decides to relax by playing the same jazz recording that the cats were playing, turning Jerry's brief contentment to immediate dismay and leaving him no better off than before.

Edited version 
In the re-animated 1966 version, Mammy Two Shoes was replaced with a white teenage girl, and her night out at the Lucky Seven Bridge Club was redone as a night out dancing with her boyfriend. Her voice was provided by voice actress June Foray, and the animation changes were done by MGM Animation/Visual Arts. In addition, Jerry's voice when he complains to Tom about the noise is muted out. This changed version is found on The Art Of Tom & Jerry laserdisc release and The Very Best of Tom & Jerry VHS release both by MGM/UA Home Video in the 1990s.

Reception 
The Film Daily reviewed the cartoon on February 16, 1950, saying, "When Beulah, the maid, steps out to her Saturday night social, Tom the cat decides to throw a shindig for the rest of the gang. This disturbs Jerry, the mouse, who tells Beulah — who hurriedly stops the party. Marvelous cartoon."

Voice cast 
 Lillian Randolph as Mammy Two Shoes (1950 original version, uncredited)
 June Foray as Teenage Girl (1966 re-animated version)
 Thea Vidale as Mammy Two Shoes (1991 redubbed version, uncredited)
 William Hanna as Jerry and Butch Cat's screams (uncredited)

Availability 
DVD:
 Tom and Jerry's Greatest Chases, Vol. 4 (1991 redubbed version)
 Tom and Jerry Spotlight Collection Vol. 2, Disc Two

References

External links 
 
 

1950 animated films
1950 films
1950 short films
Tom and Jerry short films
Short films directed by Joseph Barbera
Short films directed by William Hanna
1950s American animated films
1950s animated short films
1950 comedy films
Films scored by Scott Bradley
Jazz films
Metro-Goldwyn-Mayer short films
Metro-Goldwyn-Mayer animated short films
Films produced by Fred Quimby
Metro-Goldwyn-Mayer cartoon studio short films
1950s English-language films